Wan Kuok-koi (born 1955), popularly known as Broken Tooth Koi (崩牙駒; Cantonese: bung nga keui; Mandarin: bēng yá jū), is a gangster and former leader of the Macau branch of the 14K triad. He was released after more than 14 years in prison on 1 December 2012, and in years following has reportedly been involved in illicit gambling projects in Myanmar associated with illicit drug production and transnational organized crime groups operating in and around the Golden Triangle (Southeast Asia). In December 2020, the U.S. sanctioned Wan under the Global Magnitsky Act.

Background 

Wan had a tough childhood, growing up in the slums of Macau and fighting for his life on the streets before rising through the ranks of the 14K. His rise was accelerated by the arrival of another gangster, Ng Wai, whom he began to work for. As Wan's position in the 14K got higher, Wai asked him to 'eliminate' his boss, Mo-Ding Ping, an assignment which Wan accepted. This provoked a year-long turf war, finally coming to a close when Ping had to flee Macau to avoid a murder charge.

Gang war with former associate 

However, tension between the two gangsters grew as Wai grew wary of Wan's high-profile persona. Teaming up with rival triad group the Shui Fong, a vicious turf war broke out in 1996 and 1997. In early 1997, an unsigned letter was sent to several newspapers in the area. It said: "Warning: From this day on it is forbidden to mention Broken Tooth Koi in the press; otherwise bullets will have no eyes, and knives and bullets will have no feelings."

In 1997 Wan briefly fled Macau to avoid two arrest warrants, one from a new anti-triad law enacted in Macau, and one for drug-trafficking from China. However, in August a Portuguese judge cleared Wan of all charges, and unexpectedly retired and moved back to Portugal the very next day.

Wan then proceeded to attack Wai in public, putting up posters claiming he was a drug trafficker and declaring that anyone visiting Wai's casinos would become his enemy. Ultimately, Wan amassed enough power and influence and took over Wai's rackets completely. By this time he was earning $6 million a month from his legal gambling establishments.

Involvement in the film industry and arrest 

In the autumn of 1997, Wan approached Hong Kong movie producer Henry Fong Ping to produce a film based on his life. The result was the 1998 movie Casino (aka Ho Kong Fung Wan) starring Simon Yam as Giant, a triad boss living the high life in the Macau underworld. Wan agreed to extensive research meetings to make the film as accurate as possible, as well as using his influence on Macau to help the crew film.

One of his most outrageous stunts was to close down the Macau-Taipa Bridge for some hours to allow filming of a crucial scene in the movie. The producers had asked the Macau Government for permission to film on the bridge, closing it to traffic, but permission was denied. However, Wan wanted the scene to be shot anyway so he closed traffic from both sides of the bridge without any warning and the scene was filmed in this manner. Traffic to and from Macau was, because of this, halted for around two hours. No police intervention was made or any other measures by the Macau Government were taken to reopen the bridge to normal traffic flow on what was then one of the two links between Macau mainland and Taipa-Coloane.

A week before opening night, as he watched his own movie Casino, Wan was arrested and charged with illegal gambling, loan-sharking, criminal association, and attempted murder of chief of police Antonio Marques Baptista with a car bomb. In November 1999, in a landmark trial, he was convicted and jailed, along with eight associates including his brother Wan Kuok-hung. Wan was sentenced to 15 years in prison.  All assets of the nine were confiscated. His jail term was later reduced to 13 years and 10 months.

Post-imprisonment: Southeast Asia, Hongmen and blockchain
Wan was released from prison on 1 December 2012 and soon re-entered the casino junkets business.

In October 2017, he was part of the initial coin offering of a cryptocurrency, Dragon Coin, by a Macau-based hotel and casino corporation, Macau Dragon Group, intended to serve Mainland Chinese gamblers in Macau alongside the informal 'junket' system. The ICO reportedly raised US$320 million.

He founded and became chairman of The World Hongmen History and Culture Association (affiliated to the Hongmen), a fraternal Chinese cultural group with tens of thousands of members globally as it expanded into Cambodia on the back of a surge of Chinese investment, both Belt and Road infrastructure and gambling-related. With the blessing of the Cambodian Government, on 20 May 2018 he launched the organisation's headquarters there, saying "We will establish Hongmen schools in order to let foreigners and overseas Chinese study Chinese books, and to let foreigners read about [topics such as] loyalty, filial piety, benevolence, and justice."

The opening of the new Hongmen headquarters also saw the launch of another cryptocurrency, HB ('Hongmen cryptocurrency'), with Wan saying he expected to issue one billion HB, each valued at one US Dollar. At the event he said he also planned to invest in e-commerce and to launch Hongmen-related watches, tea, hotels and casinos.

On 15 March 2020, Wan launched Saixigang (賽西港), a new development the Burmese border town of in Myawaddy, as chairman of the Dongmei Group. The project, much like the Yatai New City in Shwe Kokko, aims to provide a new base for crime syndicates and illicit gambling operations that exited Sihanoukville after Cambodia launched a crackdown in 2019. Wan inked the deal with the Kayin State Border Guard Force, made up of former rebels from the Democratic Karen Buddhist Army.

On December 9, 2020, he and his company, Dongmei Group, were blacklisted by the US Department of Treasury for anti-corruption purposes. The Department of Treasury mentioned that it placed sanctions for World Hongmen History and Culture Association, said to a be a 14K Triad front.

References 

1955 births
Living people
Macau businesspeople
Macau gangsters
Chinese crime bosses
Triad members
People sanctioned under the Magnitsky Act
Specially Designated Nationals and Blocked Persons List